Watmore is a surname. Notable people with the surname include:

 Duncan Watmore (born 1994), English footballer
 Ian Watmore (born 1958), British management consultant
 Joanne Watmore (born 1986), British rugby union player

See also
 Whatmore (surname)